Kenneth Wilfred McCulloch (born November 1948) is a British hotelier, the founder of the hotel chains, Malmaison and Dakota Hotels.

He was born in November 1948.

References

1948 births
British hoteliers
Living people